Xingshan District is a district of the city of Hegang, Heilongjiang province, China.

Administrative divisions 
Xingshan District is divided into 4 subdistricts. 
4 subdistricts
 Lingbei, Lingnan, Goubei, Gounan

Notes and references 

Xingshan